Osamah "Osa" Ali Almarwai (born April 11, 1992) is a Saudi-born Yemeni submission grappler and Brazilian jiu-jitsu black belt competitor. 

An American National and World No-Gi champion in brown belt, Almarwai is the first black belt IBJJF World No-Gi and Pan No-Gi champion from Yemen and the Middle East. Almarwai is currently ranked No. 1 in the 2022-2023 IBJJF No-Gi Rooster division.

Early life 
Osamah Ali Almarwai was born on April 11, 1992 in Jeddah, Saudi Arabia. Almarwai has Yemen citizenship through his parents, citizens of Yemen. During Almarwai's early years he played football and taekwondo. During his teenage years he relocated to the United States where he had a brief experience training Brazilian jiu-jitsu (BJJ) at university.

Career 
At 19 he moved back to Saudi Arabia and continued training BJJ with coaches, Mohammed Al Dabbas, and Gerardo Dudamell, who awarded him his purple belt. Almarwai later trained with Karim Shah who promoted him to brown belt. 

After 7 years of training in Saudi Arabia, Almarwai moved back to the US at the age of 26. He relocated to Florida and started training at Fight Sports. In 2019, Almarwai attended an ADCC Submission Grappling training camp which persuaded him to move to California and join Atos Jiu-Jitsu under BJJ legend André Galvão. In 2019, Almarwai started competing in IBJJF competitions in the brown belt division, winning silver in 2020 at the Pan No-Gi Championship. The following year he became World No-Gi Champion and American Nationals No-Gi Champion.

After receiving his black belt from Galvao, Almarwai competed in the 2022 World No-Gi Championship in Anaheim, California where he defeated Henrique Rossi in a straight ankle lock; Coco Izutsu by points; and Roiter Silva Junior by points. In 2022, Almarwai competed in 16 competitions. As part of the Atos team, Almarwai trains with the Ruotolo brothers, Kade Ruotolo and Tye Ruotolo. Almarwai is currently ranked No. 1 in the IBJJF No-Gi black belt Rooster division.

ONE Championship 
Almarwai is scheduled to face Mikey Musumeci for the ONE Flyweight Submission Grappling World Championship at ONE Fight Night 10 on May 5, 2023.

Championships and accomplishments 
Main Achievements (Black Belt):
 Number 1 IBJJF Rooster Weight No-Gi Rankings (2022)
 IBJJF World No-Gi Champion (2022)
 IBJJF Pan No-Gi Champion (2022)
 IBJJF American Nationals No-Gi Champion (2022)
 IBJJF World Master Champion (2022)

Main Achievements (Colored Belts):
 Number 1 IBJJF Rooster Weight No-Gi Rankings (2021 brown)
 IBJJF World No-Gi Champion (2021 brown)
 IBJJF American Nationals No-Gi Champion (2021 brown)
 2nd place IBJJF Pans No-Gi Championship (2020 brown)
 2nd place IBJJF Pan Championship (2021 brown)
 3rd place IBJJF World Championship (2021 brown)

Notes

References

1992 births
Yemeni practitioners of Brazilian jiu-jitsu
Living people
People awarded a black belt in Brazilian jiu-jitsu
World No-Gi Brazilian Jiu-Jitsu Championship medalists